Run is a 2014 French-Ivorian drama film directed by Philippe Lacôte. It was screened in the Un Certain Regard section at the 2014 Cannes Film Festival. The fictionalized account of the 2011 post-election upheaval in the Ivory Coast that killed 3000 people was first film from that country selected for Cannes.

The film was also selected as the Ivorian entry for the Best Foreign Language Film at the 88th Academy Awards but it was not nominated. It received 12 nominations at the 11th Africa Movie Academy Awards but did not win any award.

Cast
 Abdoul Karim Konaté as Run
 Isaach de Bankolé as Assa
 Djinda Kane as Claire

See also
 List of submissions to the 88th Academy Awards for Best Foreign Language Film
 List of Ivorian submissions for the Academy Award for Best Foreign Language Film

References

External links
 

2014 films
2014 drama films
French drama films
Ivorian drama films
2010s French-language films
2014 directorial debut films
2010s French films